Lady Jane Grey ( – 12 February 1554), later known as Lady Jane Dudley (after her marriage) and as the "Nine Days' Queen", was an English noblewoman who claimed the throne of England and Ireland from 10 July until 19 July 1553.

Jane was the great-granddaughter of Henry VII through his younger daughter Mary, and was a first cousin once removed of Edward VI. She had an excellent humanist education, and a reputation as one of the most learned young women of her day. In May 1553, she married Lord Guildford Dudley, a younger son of Edward's chief minister John Dudley, Duke of Northumberland. In June 1553, Edward VI wrote his will, nominating Jane and her male heirs as successors to the Crown, in part because his half-sister Mary was Catholic, while Jane was a committed Protestant and would support the reformed Church of England, whose foundation Edward laid. The will removed his half-sisters, Mary and Elizabeth, from the line of succession on account of their illegitimacy, subverting their claims under the Third Succession Act.

After Edward's death, Jane was proclaimed queen on 10 July 1553, and awaited coronation in the Tower of London. Support for Mary grew quickly, and most of Jane's supporters abandoned her. The Privy Council of England suddenly changed sides, and proclaimed Mary as queen on 19 July 1553, deposing Jane. Her primary supporter, her father-in-law, the Duke of Northumberland, was accused of treason, and executed less than a month later. Jane was held prisoner in the Tower, and was convicted of high treason in November 1553, which carried a sentence of death.

Mary initially spared her life; however, Jane soon became viewed as a threat to the Crown when her father, Henry Grey, 1st Duke of Suffolk, became involved with Wyatt's rebellion against Queen Mary's intention to marry Philip of Spain. Jane and her husband were executed on 12 February 1554. At the time of her death, Jane was either 16 or 17 years old.

Early life and education 

Lady Jane Grey was the eldest daughter of Henry Grey, 1st Duke of Suffolk, and his wife, Frances. The traditional view is that she was born at Bradgate Park in Leicestershire in October 1537, while more recent research indicates that she was born somewhat earlier, possibly in London, sometime before May 1537 or between May 1536 and February 1537. This would coincide with the fact that she was noted as being in her seventeenth year at the time of her execution. Frances was the eldest daughter of Henry VIII's younger sister, Mary. Jane had two younger sisters: Lady Katherine and Lady Mary. Through their mother, the three sisters were great-granddaughters of Henry VII; great-nieces of Henry VIII; and first cousins once removed of Edward VI, Mary I and Elizabeth I.

Jane received a humanist education from John Aylmer, speaking Latin and Greek from an early age, also studying Hebrew with Aylmer, and Italian with Michelangelo Florio. Through the influence of her father and her tutors, she became a committed Protestant and also corresponded with the Zürich reformer Heinrich Bullinger.

She preferred academic studies rather than activities such as hunting parties and allegedly regarded her strict upbringing, which was typical of the time, as harsh. To the visiting scholar Roger Ascham, who found her reading Plato, she is said to have complained: For when I am in the presence either of father or mother, whether I speak, keep silence, sit, stand or go, eat, drink, be merry or sad, be sewing, playing, dancing, or doing anything else, I must do it as it were in such weight, measure and number, even so perfectly as God made the world; or else I am so sharply taunted, so cruelly threatened, yea presently sometimes with pinches, nips and bobs and other ways (which I will not name for the honour I bear them) ... that I think myself in hell.

Around February 1547, Jane was sent to live in the household of Edward VI's uncle, Thomas Seymour, who soon married Henry VIII's widow, Catherine Parr. After moving there, Jane was able to receive educational opportunities available in court circles. Jane lived with the couple at Sudeley Castle in Gloucestershire as an attendant to Catherine, until Catherine died in childbirth in September 1548. Ten years old at the time, Jane was chief mourner at Catherine's funeral. After Thomas Seymour’s arrest for treason, Jane returned to Bradgate and continued her studies.

Contracts for marriage 

Lady Jane acted as chief mourner at Catherine Parr's funeral; Thomas Seymour showed continued interest to keep her in his household, and she returned there for about two months before he was arrested at the end of 1548. Seymour's brother, the Lord Protector, Edward Seymour, 1st Duke of Somerset, felt threatened by Thomas' popularity with the young King Edward. Among other things, Thomas Seymour was charged with proposing Jane as a bride for the king.

In the course of Thomas Seymour's following attainder and execution, Jane's father was lucky to stay largely out of trouble. After his fourth interrogation by the King's Council, he proposed his daughter Jane as a bride for the Protector's eldest son, Lord Hertford. Nothing came of this, however, and Jane was not engaged until 25 May 1553, her bridegroom being Lord Guildford Dudley, a younger son of John Dudley, 1st Duke of Northumberland. The Duke, Lord President of the King's Council from late 1549, was then the most powerful man in the country. On 25 May 1553, the couple were married at Durham House in a triple wedding, in which Jane's sister Catherine was matched with the heir of the Earl of Pembroke, Lord Herbert, and another Katherine, Lord Guildford's sister, with Henry Hastings, the Earl of Huntingdon's heir.

Claim to the throne and accession 

The Third Succession Act of 1544 restored Henry VIII's daughters, Mary and Elizabeth, to the line of succession, although they were still regarded as illegitimate. Furthermore, this Act authorised Henry VIII to alter the succession by his will. Henry's will reinforced the succession of his three children, and then declared that, should none of them leave descendants, the throne would pass to heirs of his younger sister, Mary, which included Jane. For reasons unknown, Henry excluded Jane's mother, Frances Grey, from the succession, and also bypassed the claims of the descendants of his elder sister, Margaret, who had married into the Scottish royal house and nobility.

Both Mary and Elizabeth had been named illegitimate by statute during the reign of Henry VIII after his marriages to Catherine of Aragon and Anne Boleyn had been declared void. When the 15-year-old Edward VI lay dying in early summer 1553, his Catholic half-sister Mary was still his heir presumptive. Edward, in a draft will ("My devise for the Succession") composed earlier in 1553, had first restricted the succession to (non-existent) male descendants of Frances Brandon and her daughters, before he named his Protestant cousin "Lady Jane and her heirs male" as his successors, probably in June 1553; the intent was to ensure his Protestant legacy, thereby bypassing Mary, a Roman Catholic. Edward's decision to name Jane Grey herself was possibly instigated by Northumberland.

Edward VI personally supervised the copying of his will which was finally issued as letters patent on 21 June and signed by 102 notables, among them the whole Privy Council, peers, bishops, judges, and London aldermen. Edward also announced to have his "declaration" passed in parliament in September, and the necessary writs were prepared.
The King died on 6 July 1553, but his death was not announced until four days later. On 9 July, Jane was informed that she was now queen, and according to her own later claims, accepted the crown only with reluctance. On 10 July, she was officially proclaimed Queen of England, France and Ireland after she had taken up secure residence in the Tower of London, where English monarchs customarily resided from the time of accession until coronation. Jane refused to name her husband Dudley as king, because that would require an Act of Parliament.

Northumberland faced a number of key tasks to consolidate his power after Edward's death. Most importantly, he had to isolate and, ideally, capture Mary Tudor to prevent her from gathering support. As soon as Mary was sure of King Edward's demise, she left her residence at Hunsdon and set out to East Anglia, where she began to rally her supporters. Northumberland set out from London with troops on 14 July to capture Mary. The Privy Council switched their allegiance and proclaimed Mary queen in London, on 19 July. The historical consensus assumes that this was in recognition of overwhelming support of the population for Mary. However, there is no clear evidence for that outside Norfolk and Suffolk, where Northumberland had put down Kett's Rebellion, hence where princess Mary sought refuge. Rather, it seems that Henry FitzAlan, 19th Earl of Arundel—whom Northumberland had arrested and detained twice as an ally of Somerset, before rehabilitating him—engineered a coup d'état in the Privy Council in Northumberland's absence.

Jane is often called the Nine-Day Queen, although if her reign is dated from the moment of Edward's death on 6 July 1553, her reign could have been a few days longer. On 19 July 1553, Jane was imprisoned in the Tower's Gentleman Gaoler's apartments, her husband in the Beauchamp Tower. The Duke of Northumberland was executed on 22 August 1553. In September, Parliament declared Mary the rightful successor and denounced and revoked Jane's proclamation as that of a usurper.

Trial and execution 
Referred to by the court as Jane Dudley, wife of Guildford, Jane was charged with high treason, as were her husband, two of his brothers, and the former archbishop of Canterbury, Thomas Cranmer. Their trial, by a special commission, took place on 13 November 1553, at Guildhall in the City of London. The commission was chaired by Sir Thomas White, Lord Mayor of London, and Thomas Howard, 3rd Duke of Norfolk. Other members included Edward Stanley, 3rd Earl of Derby, and John Bourchier, 2nd Earl of Bath. As was to be expected, all defendants were found guilty and sentenced to death. Jane's guilt, of having treacherously assumed the title and the power of the monarch, was evidenced by a number of documents she had signed as "Jane the Quene". Her sentence was to "be burned alive on Tower Hill or beheaded as the Queen pleases" (burning was the traditional English punishment for treason committed by women). The imperial ambassador reported to Charles V, Holy Roman Emperor, that her life was to be spared. 

Wyatt's rebellion in January 1554 against Queen Mary's marriage plans with Philip of Spain sealed Jane's fate. Her father, Henry Grey, 1st Duke of Suffolk, and his two brothers joined the rebellion, and so the government decided to go through with the verdict against Jane and Guildford. Their execution was first scheduled for 9 February 1554, but was then postponed for three days to give Jane a chance to convert to the Catholic faith. Mary sent her chaplain John Feckenham to Jane, who was initially not pleased about this. Though she would not give in to his efforts "to save her soul", she became friends with him and allowed him to accompany her to the scaffold.

On the morning of 12 February 1554, the authorities took Guildford from his rooms at the Tower of London to the public execution place at Tower Hill, where he was beheaded. A horse and cart brought his remains back to the Tower, past the rooms where Jane was staying. Seeing her husband's corpse return, Jane is reported to have exclaimed: "Oh, Guildford, Guildford." She was then taken out to Tower Green, inside the Tower, to be beheaded. According to the account of her execution given in the anonymous Chronicle of Queen Jane and of Two Years of Queen Mary, which formed the basis for Raphael Holinshed's depiction, Jane gave a speech upon ascending the scaffold:

Good people, I am come hither to die, and by a law I am condemned to the same. The fact, indeed, against the Queen's highness was unlawful, and the consenting thereunto by me: but touching the procurement and desire thereof by me or on my behalf, I do wash my hands thereof in innocency, before God, and the face of you, good Christian people, this day.

While admitting to action considered unlawful, she declared that "I do wash my hands thereof in innocence". Jane then recited Psalm 51 (Have mercy upon me, O God) in English, and handed her gloves and handkerchief to her maid. The executioner asked her forgiveness, which she granted him, pleading: "I pray you dispatch me quickly." Referring to her head, she asked, "Will you take it off before I lay me down?", and the axeman answered: "No, madam." She then blindfolded herself. Jane then failed to find the block with her hands, and cried, "What shall I do? Where is it?" Probably Sir Thomas Brydges, the Deputy Lieutenant of the Tower, helped her find her way. With her head on the block, Jane spoke the last words of Jesus as recounted by Luke: "Lord, into thy hands I commend my spirit!" The axe then fell and Jane was beheaded in one clean stroke.

Jane and Guildford are buried in the Chapel of St Peter ad Vincula on the north side of Tower Green. No memorial stone was erected at their grave. Jane's father, the Duke of Suffolk, was executed 11 days after Jane, on 23 February 1554. Her mother, the Duchess of Suffolk, married her Master of the Horse and chamberlain, Adrian Stokes, in March 1555. She was fully pardoned by Mary and allowed to live at Court with her two surviving daughters. She died in 1559.

Legacy 

"The traitor-heroine of the Reformation", as historian Albert Pollard called her, was only a teenager at the time of her execution. During and in the aftermath of the Marian persecutions, Jane became viewed as a Protestant martyr for centuries, featuring prominently in the several editions of Foxe's Book of Martyrs (Actes and Monuments of these Latter and Perillous Dayes) by John Foxe. The tale of Lady Jane grew to legendary proportions in popular culture, producing romantic biographies, novels, plays, operas, paintings, and films, notably Lady Jane starring Helena Bonham Carter.

Family tree 

Italics indicate people who predeceased Edward VI;Arabic numerals (1–5) indicate Edward VI's line of succession at his death according to Henry VIII's will; andRoman numerals (I–III) indicate Edward VI's line of succession at his death according to Edward's will.

References

Bibliography 

 
 
 
 
 Bindoff, Stanley T. (1953) "A Kingdom at Stake, 1553." History Today 3.9 (1953): 642–28.
 

 
 Hoak, Dale. (2015) "The Succession Crisis of 1553 and Mary’s Rise to Power", in Catholic Renewal and Protestant Resistance in Marian England ed. by E. Evenden and V. Westbrook (Aldershot, 2015), pp. 17–42.
 
 Kewes, Paulina. (2017) "The 1553 Succession Crisis Reconsidered." Historical Research (2017).

External links 

 
 Lady Jane Grey at the official website of the British monarchy
 
 
 

 
Jane
1530s births
1554 deaths
16th-century women rulers
16th-century English women
16th-century English monarchs
16th-century Irish monarchs
Burials at the Church of St Peter ad Vincula
Daughters of English dukes
Jane
English Anglicans
Executed English people
English people of Welsh descent
English pretenders to the French throne
Executed English women
Executed monarchs
Executions at the Tower of London
Jane Grey
People executed by Tudor England by decapitation
People executed under Mary I of England
People executed under the Tudors for treason against England
People from Leicester
Prisoners in the Tower of London
Protestant monarchs
Queens regnant of England
Heads of government who were later imprisoned
Dethroned monarchs
Executed children